Bel Cantanti is an American opera company under the direction of Dr. Katerina Souvorova. It was formed in 2003 to give performance opportunities to operatic talent in the Washington, D.C. area.   It has produced more than 50 different fully staged operas and gala events with young professionals since 2003.  The productions has been in a variety of venues including: the Austrian Embassy in D.C., the French Embassy in Georgetown, and the German Embassy in D.C..  Bel Cantanti performed at the Randolph Theater in Silver Spring, Maryland, located in a Montgomery County, Maryland community center, until the County closed the center in favor of an affordable housing project.  Most performances are now held at the Bender Jewish Community Center in Rockville, Maryland.

Productions 
In December 2003, Bel Cantanti held its first fully–staged opera production, Menotti's Amahl and the Night Visitors, at St. James Episcopal Church in Leesburg, Virginia. Bel Cantanti has had continued success with its productions of : Donizetti's L'elisir d'Amore, Verdi's Rigoletto, Menotti's Amahl and the Night Visitors, Tchaikovsky's Eugene Onegin, Rossini's Il barbiere di Siviglia, Donizetti's La fille du régiment, Humperdinck's Hänsel und Gretel, Rachmaninoff's Aleko, Tchaikovsky's Iolanta, Mozart's Le nozze di Figaro, and Donizetti's Lucia di Lammermoor.  The company's 2007-2008 season produced fully staged versions of Mozart's Die Entführung aus dem Serail (The Abduction from the Seraglio, performed in German, March 2008) and G. Puccini's birth with an abridged version of La bohème. In December 2007 Bel Cantanti is performing a concert version of Humperdinck's Hänsel und Gretel.

Reviews 

Bel Cantanti and its young performers, coached by Katerina Souvorova, have garnered excellent reviews over the years in The Washington Post, The Washington Times, Ionarts.blogspot.com, and other local papers.

External links
Bel Cantanti Opera website
On Choosing Operas
Washington Times Review of Lucia di Lammermoor 2007
Bel Cantanti's New Home

American opera companies
Musical groups established in 2003
Performing arts in Maryland
Performing arts in Washington, D.C.